In 1993, Paul McCartney and his band embarked upon The New World Tour, spanning almost the entire year and almost the entire globe. This tour featured a controversial pre-concert film (starting in the U.S leg of the tour), which was shown before all of the concerts and had graphic animal test footage in the film. The tour incorporated painted stage sets (at the time the world's largest, measuring 16,400 square feet), projections, and promotional material designed by a regular McCartney collaborator, the artist Brian Clarke.

The 1993 World Tour was Paul's last tour for nine years, after his wife and band member Linda McCartney was diagnosed with breast cancer in 1995, as well as Linda's last tour during her lifetime, before she died in 1998 at the age of 56.

Promotion
The tour was intended to promote McCartney's ninth studio album Off the Ground. Despite having released three albums of live material in the space of the previous three years (Tripping the Live Fantastic, Tripping the Live Fantastic: Highlights!, and Unplugged), the tour was followed by the live album Paul Is Live, consisting of material taken from The New World Tour. However, the release was not embraced by record-buyers, becoming McCartney's lowest-selling live album.

Touring
McCartney's touring band consisted of himself, wife Linda McCartney, Hamish Stuart, Robbie McIntosh, Paul "Wix" Wickens and Blair Cunningham. The final North American stop, in Charlotte, North Carolina, was broadcast live across the United States, with some songs replaced by commercials, by the Fox Television Network. This was McCartney's final tour of the 20th century. Several venues on the tour featured McCartney's first concert appearance there since his touring days with The Beatles.

This was the third and second times Paul McCartney toured Australia and New Zealand, respectively. A proposed further tour to Australia in 2002 was cancelled after the Bali Bombings. His next visit to Australia and New Zealand finally occurred for the first time in over twenty-four years on the One on One tour in 2017. In 1993, before Paul McCartney played the South American leg of the tour, Parlophone/MPL released the album Paul Is Live which had songs taken from his concerts in North America and Australia.
In 2002, Paul McCartney released a concert DVD from the tour titled Paul Is Live in Concert on the New World Tour.

Tour band
 Paul McCartney – lead vocals, guitars (acoustic, electric and bass), piano, drums
 Linda McCartney – backing vocals, keyboards, percussion, autoharp
 Hamish Stuart – backing vocals, guitars (acoustic, electric, acoustic bass and electric bass)
 Robbie McIntosh – backing vocals, guitars (electric and acoustic)
 Paul "Wix" Wickens – backing vocals, keyboards, accordion, acoustic guitar, percussion
 Blair Cunningham – drums, percussion

Tour dates

Set list

Instruments played by band members

References 

1993 concert tours
Paul McCartney concert tours